Kevin Voornhout (born 20 November 1995) is a former professional Dutch darts player who plays in Professional Darts Corporation events.

He won the WDF Europe Youth Cup in both the Boys and Team event in 2012, and won a PDC Tour Card in 2014.

References

External links
Profile and stats on Darts Database

1995 births
Living people
Dutch darts players